In category theory, a branch of mathematics, Mac Lane coherence theorem states, in the words of Saunders Mac Lane, “every diagram commutes”. More precisely (cf. #Counter-example), it states every formal diagram commutes, where "formal diagram" is an analog of well-formed formulae and terms in proof theory.

Counter-example 
It is not reasonable to expect we can show literally every diagram commutes, due to the following example of Isbell.

Let  be a skeleton of the category of sets and D a unique countable set in it; note  by uniqueness. Let  be the projection onto the first factor. For any functions , we have . Then for any , since  is the identity and is natural,
.
Since  is an epimorphism, this implies . Similarly, using the projection onto the second factor, we get  and so , which is absurd.

Proof

Notes

References 
 
Section 5 of Saunders Mac Lane, Topology and Logic as a Source of Algebra (Retiring Presidential Address), Bulletin of the AMS 82:1, January 1976.

External links 
https://ncatlab.org/nlab/show/coherence+theorem+for+monoidal+categories
https://ncatlab.org/nlab/show/Mac+Lane%27s+proof+of+the+coherence+theorem+for+monoidal+categories
https://unapologetic.wordpress.com/2007/06/29/mac-lanes-coherence-theorem/

Category theory